The 2019 AFF Futsal Championship will be the 16th edition of the tournament. The tournament was held in Ho Chi Minh City, Vietnam.

Same as the previous tournament which were held in odd years, the tournament serves as AFC Futsal Championship qualification. Top 3 teams of the tournament will qualify for 2020 AFC Futsal Championship in Turkmenistan as AFF's representative.

Entrants 
There was no qualification, and all entrants advanced to the final tournament. The following 8 teams from member associations of the ASEAN Football Federation entered the tournament. Australia came back for this tournament after 4 years of absence since their last appearance in 2015 AFF Futsal Championship.

Venue
All matches are held in Phú Thọ Indoor Stadium, Ho Chi Minh City.

Group stage
All times are local time: UTC+7.

Group A

Group B

Knockout stage

Bracket

Semi-finals
The winners will qualify for 2020 AFC Futsal Championship.

Third place match
The winner will qualify for 2020 AFC Futsal Championship.

Final

Winners

Qualified teams
The following teams qualified for 2020 AFC Futsal Championship.

Goalscorers 

7 goals

 Muhammad Osamanmusa

6 goals

 Kritsada Wongkaeo

5 goals

 Ronnachai Jungwongsuk

4 goals

 Andri Kustiawan
 Ridzwan Bakri
 Naing Ye Kyaw 
 Nyein Min Soe
 Pornmongkol Srisubseang
 Suphawut Thueanklang

3 goals

 Iqbal Rahmattulah
 Subhan Faidasa
 Aung Zin Oo
 Hlaing Min Tun
 Pyae Phyo Maung
 Jetsada Chudech
 Warut Wangsama-aeo
 Watchara Laisri
 Nguyễn Minh Trí

2 goals

 Jarrod Basger
 Daniel Fogarty
 Grant Lynch
 Keo Cheatuo
 Orkchan Sereyvong
 Ko Ko Lwin
 Pyae Phyo Maung
 Nattawut Madyalan
 Mario Moniz
 Trần Thái Huy
 Trần Văn Vũ

1 goal

 Adam Cooper
 Wade Giovenali
 Nathan Niski
 Heng Sokly
 Ros Sirotha
 Ardiansyah Nur
 Bambang Saptaji
 Firman Ardiansyah
 Marvin Wossiry
 Syahidansyah Lubis
 Abu Haniffa Hasan
 Azwann Ismail
 Saiful Nizam Ali
 Kaung Chit Thu 
 Khin Zaw Lin
 Kyaw Soe Moe
 Wai Zin Oo
 Apiwat Chaemcharoen
 Jirawat Sornwichian
 Remigio Duarte
 Ilidio Nunes
 Eufrasio Soares
 Bendito Ximenes
 Châu Đoàn Phát
 Nguyễn Mạnh Dũng
 Nguyễn Thành Tín
 Nhan Gia Hưng
 Phạm Đức Hòa 
 Vũ Đức Tùng 

1 own goal

 Gregory Giovenali 
 Remigio Duarte 
 Eufrasio Soares

References

External links 
AFF Futsal Championship 2019

AFF Futsal Championship
AFF 2019
International futsal competitions hosted by Vietnam
Aff Futsal Championship
Aff Futsal Championship